J. Frederick Burns was an American politician from Maine. A Republican from Houlton, Maine, Burns served in the Maine Senate from 1934 to 1940. From 1936 to 1938, Burns was the Senate President.

Burns was a Republican delegate to the 1936 Republican National Convention from Maine's 3rd congressional district.

References

Year of birth missing
Year of death missing
People from Houlton, Maine
Presidents of the Maine Senate
Republican Party Maine state senators